Lakshmi Venu is an Indian businesseswoman and the managing director of Sundaram-Clayton. She is an heiress to the Chennai-based conglomerate TVS Group, which was established by her great-grandfather T. V. Sundaram Iyengar.

Background and education
Lakshmi is the daughter of Venu Srinivasan and Mallika Srinivasan. Both of Lakshmi's parents run separate business empires which they inherited from their respective fathers. Venu Srinivasan runs the TVS Group (Sundaram-Clayton Group) founded by his grandfather T. V. Sundaram Iyengar, while Mallika Srinivasan runs the TAFE Group companies (of the Amalgamations Group) inherited from her father, A. Sivasailam. 

Lakshmi has one brother, Sudarshan Venu. She grew up in Chennai and studied at Sishya School in Adyar. She did her degree in economics from Yale University and then her Doctorate in Engineering Management from University of Warwick.

Career
Lakshmi was appointed Joint managing director in Sundaram Clayton at a young age.

Personal life
In 2011, she married Rohan Murty, son of Infosys founder N. R. Narayana Murthy and Sudha Murthy. They divorced in 2015.

In March 2018, it was announced that Lakshmi had married Mahesh Gogineni in a private ceremony held in Jodhpur. Mahesh Gogineni, is the grandson of N. G. Ranga. He is a first-generation entrepreneur who runs a small-time tech start-up.

References

1983 births
Indian women chief executives
Living people
Businesspeople from Chennai
Automotive industry in India
People in the automobile industry
Businesswomen from Tamil Nadu
TVS Group